The Argiles à Plicatules (French for: "clay with Plicatula") is a geological formation in northern central France whose strata date back to the Early Cretaceous. Dinosaur remains are among the fossils that have been recovered from the formation.

Fossil content 
 Iguanodon bernissartensis 
 Mantellisaurus atherfieldensis

See also 
 List of dinosaur-bearing rock formations

References 

Lower Cretaceous Series of Europe
Aptian Stage